Yolo (Wintun: Yo-loy) is an unincorporated community and census-designated place in Yolo County, California. It is located 4.9 miles northwest of the county seat, Woodland and 24 miles northwest of the state capital of Sacramento. Yolo's ZIP Code is 95697 and its area code 530. It lies at an elevation of 82 feet (25 m). The population was 421 at the 2020 census.

History
Yolo was formerly known as "Cacheville", "Cochran's Crossing", "Cochranes Crossing", "Hutton's Ranch", and "Travelers Home".

Education
Cache Creek High School, a continuation high school named after the nearby stream of water, is located in Yolo and is a part of the Woodland Joint Unified School District. Students residing in Yolo go to schools  in Woodland, unless high school students choose to attend Cache Creek.

Geography
According to the United States Census Bureau, the CDP covers an area of 1.4 square miles (3.6 km), all of it land.

Climate
The Köppen Climate Classification subtype for this climate is "CSA " (Mediterranean Climate).

Demographics
The 2010 United States Census reported that Yolo had a population of 452. The racial makeup of Yolo was 278 (61.8%) White, 0 (0.0%) African American, 9 (2.0%) Native American, 0 (0.0%) Asian, 0 (0.0%) Pacific Islander, 151 (33.6%) from other races, and 12 (2.7%) from two or more races. Hispanic or Latino of any race were 293 persons (65.1%).

The Census reported that 452 people (100% of the population) lived in households, 0 (0%) lived in non-institutionalized group quarters, and 0 (0%) were institutionalized.

There were 149 households, out of which 67 (45.0%) had children under the age of 18 living in them, 81 (54.4%) were opposite-sex married couples living together, 21 (14.1%) had a female householder with no husband present, 10 (6.7%) had a male householder with no wife present.  There were 8 (5.4%) unmarried opposite-sex partnerships, and 1 (0.7%) same-sex married couple or partnership. 30 households (20.1%) were made up of individuals, and 11 (7.4%) had someone living alone who was 65 years of age or older. The average household size was 3.02.  There were 112 families (75.2% of all households); the average family size was 3.49.

The population was spread out, with 135 people (30.0%) under the age of 18, 33 people (7.3%) aged 18 to 24, 113 people (25.1%) aged 25 to 44, 128 people (28.4%) aged 45 to 64, and 41 people (9.1%) who were 65 years of age or older.  The median age was 35.9 years. For every 100 females, there were 90.7 males.  For every 100 females age 18 and over, there were 85.3 males.

The homeowner vacancy rate was 2.7%; the rental vacancy rate was 4.9%.  205 people (45.6% of the population) lived in owner-occupied housing units and 245 people (54.5%) lived in rental housing units.

References

External links

Census-designated places in Yolo County, California
Unincorporated communities in California
Former county seats in California
Census-designated places in California
Unincorporated communities in Yolo County, California